The 1984–85 NCAA Division I men's basketball season began in November 1984 and ended with the Final Four in Lexington, Kentucky on April 1, 1985. The Villanova Wildcats won their first NCAA national championship with a 66–64 victory over the defending champion, top-ranked Georgetown Hoyas. It was the second time in three seasons that the national champion had 10 losses.

Season headlines 
 The 1985 NCAA Tournament was the first to feature a 64-team field.
 Georgetown was the first defending champion to return to the Final Four since the 1975–76 UCLA Bruins.

Major rule changes 
Beginning in 1984–85, the following rules changes were implemented:
The coaching box was introduced, whereby a coach and all bench personnel had to remain in the 28-foot-long coaching box unless seeking information from the scorers’ table.

Season outlook

Pre-season polls 
The top 20 from the AP Poll during the pre-season.
{|
|- style="vertical-align:top;"
|

Regular season

Conference winners and tournaments

Statistical leaders

Conference standings

Postseason tournaments

NCAA tournament

Final Four - Rupp Arena, Lexington, Kentucky

National Invitation tournament

NIT Semifinals and Final

Award winners

Consensus All-American teams

Major player of the year awards 

 Wooden Award: Chris Mullin, St. John's
 Naismith Award: Patrick Ewing, Georgetown
 Associated Press Player of the Year: Patrick Ewing, Georgetown
 UPI Player of the Year: Chris Mullin, St. John's
 NABC Player of the Year: Patrick Ewing, Georgetown
 Oscar Robertson Trophy (USBWA): Chris Mullin, St. John's
 Adolph Rupp Trophy: Chris Mullin, St. John's
 Sporting News Player of the Year: Patrick Ewing, Georgetown

Major coach of the year awards 
 Associated Press Coach of the Year: Bill Frieder, Michigan
 UPI Coach of the Year: Lou Carnesecca, St. John's
 Henry Iba Award (USBWA): Lou Carnesecca, St. John's
 NABC Coach of the Year: John Thompson, Georgetown
 CBS/Chevrolet Coach of the Year: Dale Brown, LSU
 Sporting News Coach of the Year:  Lou Carnesecca, St. John's

Other major awards 
 Frances Pomeroy Naismith Award (Best player under 6'0): Bubba Jennings, Texas Tech
 Robert V. Geasey Trophy (Top player in Philadelphia Big 5): Ed Pinckney, Villanova
 NIT/Haggerty Award (Top player in New York City metro area): Chris Mullin, St. John's (3-time recipient)

Coaching changes 

A number of teams changed coaches during the season and after it ended.

References 

 
NCAA